Filthy Notes for Frozen Hearts is the seventh album by the German band Lacrimas Profundere. A video clip was released for the song "Again It's Over" and "My Velvet Little Darkness". "Again It's Over" was released on its own single prior to Filthy Notes For Frozen Hearts. An acoustic version of "Filthy Notes" was made available for preorders from Amazon.

Track listing
All Songs Written By Christopher Schmid and Oliver Nikolas Schmid, except where noted.

Bonus Limited Edition Digipack Tracks
<li>"Shiver"

Limited Edition Enhanced CD Video Content
 Again It's Over (Video) - 3:26
 Again It's Over - Making Of (Video) - 4:18

Preorder Bonus Track
 Filthy Notes (Acoustic Version) - 3:16

Personnel
 Christopher Schmid - Vocals
 Oliver Nikolas Schmid - Guitar
 Tony Berger - Guitar
 Christian Steiner - Keyboards
 Daniel Lechner - Bass
 Kori Fuhrman - Drums

Production
 Produced and Mixed By John Fryer
 Pre-Production By Christian Steiner
 Engineered By John Fryer and Christian Steiner
 Mastered By Mika Jussila

External links
[ "Filthy Notes For Frozen Hearts" at allmusic]

Lacrimas Profundere albums
2006 albums
Albums produced by John Fryer (producer)
Napalm Records albums